The Cleveland mayoral election of 1949 saw the reelection of Thomas A. Burke to a third consecutive term.

General election

References

Mayoral elections in Cleveland
Cleveland mayoral
Cleveland
Cleveland mayoral election
1940s in Cleveland